Karchak-e Larijani (also Romanized as Karchak-e Lārījānī; also known as Karchak) is a village in Ahlamerestaq-e Jonubi Rural District, in the Central District of Mahmudabad County, Mazandaran Province, Iran. At the 2006 census, its population was 302, in 81 families.

References 

Populated places in Mahmudabad County